Mors et vita is an oratorio in three parts by Charles Gounod premiered at the Birmingham Festival in 1885. It was conceived as a sequel to La rédemption (1882). The 1886 Paris premiere again featured Jean-Baptiste Faure. Gounod considered this oratorio, and its predecessor La rédemption (1882) as his greatest achievements.

Recordings
Michel Plasson EMI

References

1885 compositions
Oratorios based on the Bible
Oratorios by Charles Gounod